Mitsuka Ikeda (born 15 September 1932) is a Japanese gymnast. She competed in seven events at the 1956 Summer Olympics.

References

1932 births
Living people
Japanese female artistic gymnasts
Olympic gymnasts of Japan
Gymnasts at the 1956 Summer Olympics
Place of birth missing (living people)
20th-century Japanese women